Yousuf Ali Sayeed (born 19 August 1971) is a Pakistani jurist who has been Justice of the [[Sindh High CourtMr. Justice Yousuf Ali Sayeed studied at the Karachi Grammar School, before going on to read law at the University of Buckingham, from where he obtained an LLB with Hons.

He was enrolled to practice in 1999; certified to appear before the High Courts in 2001; and signed the roll at the Supreme Court in 2013. Over that period he remained an active litigator on the civil side and for some years was an honorary lecturer at the S.M.Law College and Hamdard Law University, apart from delivering lectures on various topics from time to time at the Sindh Judicial Academy.

Justice Sayeed was elevated as an Additional Judge of the Sindh High Court on November 30, 2016, and confirmed in office on November 27, 2017. During his tenure, to date, he has been a part of civil, criminal and constitutional benches and authored numerous judgments in those areas, with a number of judgments being reported in the national law journals. He has also served as the Appellate Tribunal and Election Tribunal for various districts of Karachi in the context of the 2018 General Elections.

Presently, he is the designated Monitoring Judge of District Shaheed Benazirabad and represents the Sindh High Court on the Board of Governors of the Indus Valley School of Art and Architecture. He is also a member of the Information Technology Committee of the Court, as well as member of the National Judicial Automation Committee.

He was the Court’s delegate on a tour organised by the Legal Aid Society to meet with key state and justice actors in Turkey so as to examine the Alternate Dispute Resolution practices prevalent in their jurisdiction, and was also the keynote speaker on Climate Justice at a Law Conference organised by Justice Project Pakistan, in collaboration with the Ministry of Law & Justice, to highlight Pakistan’s application of international human rights law.] since 30 November 2016.

References

1971 births
Living people
Judges of the Sindh High Court
Pakistani judges